Church of St. Nicholas ( / Crkva Svetog Nikole) was a Serbian Orthodox church located in Slovinje, in the municipality of Lipljan, Kosovo. The church was built in 16th century, demolished in 19th century, and rebuilt in 1996. It was again completely demolished by the Kosovo Albanians in 1999.

History 
The church, dedicated to St. Nicholas, was built in the 16th century. The first time Albanians demolished it in the 19th century and sold all the construction material to the company that built Kosovo railway (1871-1873).

The church was rebuilt in 1996. After the arrival of the British KFOR troops in June 1999, the church was again demolished by the Kosovo Albanians. On 17 July 1999, the church was dynamited and razed to the ground.

Notes

References

Sources

External links 
 The list of destroyed and desecrated churches in Kosovo and Metohija June-October 1999 (Списак уништених и оскрнављених цркава на Косову и Метохији јун-октобар 1999)
 The list of destroyed, burned and demolished churches  (Spisak uništenih, spaljenih i demoliranih crkava), svetosavlje.org
 St. Nicholas Center photo gallery

Serbian Orthodox church buildings in Kosovo
Churches in Pristina
Medieval Serbian sites in Kosovo
Destroyed churches in Kosovo
Persecution of Serbs
Religious organizations established in the 1600s
Former Serbian Orthodox churches
16th-century Serbian Orthodox church buildings
1600 establishments in Europe
Cultural heritage of Kosovo
Protected Monuments of Culture
Buildings and structures demolished in 1999